Verdine may refer to:

 Gregory L. Verdine, American biologist
 Verdine White, American musician